Acacia phlebopetala is a shrub belonging to the genus Acacia and the subgenus Phyllodineae that is endemic to south western Australia.

Description
Like most species of Acacia it has phyllodes rather than true leaves. The evergreen, glabrous or hairy phyllodes appear crowded on the branchlets. It blooms from September to April and produces cream-white flowers.

Taxonomy
There are two variations for this species:
 Acacia phlebopetala var. phlebopetala
 Acacia phlebopetala var. pubescens

Distribution
It is native to an area in the Great Southern and Goldfields-Esperance regions of Western Australia where it is commonly situated on rocky cliffs, along watercourses, on sandplains and on coastal cliffs and dunes growing in sandy or loamy or clay soils often over or around limestone, laterite or quartzite. Its distribution extends from around Beaufort Inlet in the west to around Munglinup in the east, the bulk of the population being found in Fitzgerald River National Park with an isolated population between Lake King and Newdegate to the north west.

See also
 List of Acacia species

References

phlebopetala
Acacias of Western Australia
Taxa named by Bruce Maslin
Plants described in 1978